Prisma is a satellite project led by the Swedish Space Corporation (SSC) which consist of two satellites that fly in formation. Prisma is operated in collaboration with CNES, the French space agency, which provides the radiofrequency metrology system that enables the satellites to fly in close formation while autonomously avoiding collisions.

It was launched, along with the PICARD spacecraft, on 15 June 2010 on a Dnepr launcher from Dombarovskiy Cosmodrome, near Yasny, Russia. Its primary objective is to test autonomous formation flying.  A secondary objective was to flight test a new monopropellant thruster using ammonium dinitramide (ADN) propellant. 

On 12 August 2010, SSC reported that the two satellites, called Mango and Tango, had separated from each other for the first time.

References

External links

Prisma Satellites
About Prisma

Space programme of Sweden
Spacecraft launched in 2010
Spacecraft launched by Dnepr rockets